The Real World (retrospectively referred to as The Real World: New York, to distinguish it from subsequent installments of the series) is the first season of MTV's reality television series The Real World, which focuses on a group of diverse strangers living together for several months as cameras follow their lives and interpersonal relationships. It was created by producers Mary-Ellis Bunim and Jonathan Murray.

The cast consisted of seven people, ranging in age from 19 to 26, most of whom were already living in New York City when the series taped. The cast was filmed living in a SoHo loft from February 16 to May 18, 1992, and the series premiered May 21 that year. This is the first of three seasons to be filmed in New York City. In 2001, the show returned to the city in its tenth season, and again in 2008 for its twenty-first season, set in the borough of Brooklyn. In 2021, the original cast reunited for The Real World Homecoming: New York.

As the first season of one of the first series in what is now considered the reality television genre, The Real World: New York is sometimes credited with pioneering some of the conventions of the genre, including bringing together a group of participants who had not previously met, and the use of "confessional" interviews with participants to double as the show's narration (though in the first season, the confessional interviews were sparse and were not taped in a separate, private room, as would become common later). Some, however, have credited an earlier series, the 1991 Dutch TV show Nummer 28, for these innovations.

Production history

The Real World was originally inspired by the popularity of youth-oriented shows of the 1990s like Beverly Hills 90210. Bunim and Murray initially considered developing a scripted series in a similar vein, but quickly decided that the cost of paying writers, actors, costume designers, and make-up artists was too high. Bunim and Murray decided against this idea, and at the last minute, pulled the concept (and the cast) before it became the first season of the show. Tracy Grandstaff, one of the original seven picked for what has come to be known as "Season 0", went on to minor fame as the voice of the animated Beavis and Butt-head character Daria Morgendorffer, who eventually got her own spinoff, Daria. Dutch TV producer Erik Latour claims that the ideas for The Real World were directly derived from his television show Nummer 28, which aired in 1991 on Dutch television. Bunim/Murray decided upon the cheaper idea of casting a bunch of "regular people" to live in an apartment and taping their day-to-day lives, believing seven diverse people would have enough of a basis upon which to interact without scripts. The production cast seven cast members from 500 applicants, paying them $2,600 for their time on the show.

The production discovered a nine-story, ten-unit residential co-op building at 565 Broadway, at the corner of Prince Street, in Manhattan's SoHo district, after much searching, and converted the massive, 4000-square-foot duplex to be the residence and filming location. Walls separating two adjacent apartments on the second and third floors were removed in order to form a single , four bedroom residence, and were renovated for the filming of the series. Production personnel, which included up to 13 people at one time, utilized a work space with a separate entrance. The cast lived in the loft from February 16 to May 18, 1992. The series premiered three days later, on May 21, 1992.

Critical reception
At the time of its initial airing, reviews of the show were mostly negative. Matt Roush, writing in USA Today, characterized the show as "painfully bogus", and a cynical and exploitative new low in television, commenting, "Watching The Real World, which fails as documentary (too phony) and as entertainment (too dull), it's hard to tell who's using who more." The Washington Post's Tom Shales commented, "Ah to be young, cute, and stupid, and to have too much free time...Such is the lot facing the wayward wastrels of The Real World, something new in excruciating torture from the busy minds at MTV." Shales also remarked upon the cast members’ creative career choices, saying, "You might want to think about getting a real job."

Nonetheless, the series was a hit with viewers, and the initial seasons have come to be reassessed. Writing in 2011, Meredith Blake of The A.V. Club found the cast to be "ambitious, articulate, and thoughtful". Though she conceded that nearly all of the cast were pursuing careers as performers, and thus had ulterior motives for appearing on the show, she found their motivations "relatively noble" compared to that of later participants in reality TV shows, many of whom wanted simply to become famous by appearing on TV. She wrote that later seasons of The Real World had become "too much to bear" after "cast members figured out that the best way to get screen time was to act out - not to sit around having freshman dorm-room-style conversations about race relations." She wrote that, by contrast to more recent examples of reality TV, "The Real World: New York now seems incredibly, achingly earnest, bracingly raw, and sweetly idealistic."

Cast

: Age at the time of filming.

Cameo appearances
Isiah Thomas, Dennis Rodman and Bill Laimbeer make cameo appearances in Episode 5, when castmates Eric Nies and Kevin Powell attend a New York Knicks game at Madison Square Garden. Larry Johnson appears in Episode 7 to meet castmates Heather Gardner and Julie Gentry, who attend a Hornets game at the Brendan Byrne Arena. Matt Pinfield, a radio host for 106.3 FM, has a cameo in Episode 8 when cast member Andre Comeau's band, Reigndance, appears for an interview with that station. In Episode 9, cast members attend a rally for 1992 U.S. Presidential candidate Jerry Brown, at which both Brown and Michael Moore are shown speaking.

Episodes

After filming
After filming the season, the cast reunited for the second-season premiere, and provided their predictions, advice and other thoughts regarding the Los Angeles cast. Heather Gardner predicted that someone would leave that cast. (David Edwards eventually did so.)

Warner/Chappell Music signed Rebecca Blasband to a publishing contract and financed a "surprisingly solid" extended-play CD called The Rebecca Blasband. She moved to Denver, Colorado in March 1995, and has opened for Edwyn Collins and Squeeze.

Andre Comeau eventually left Reigndance and joined another band, River Rouge. In 2011 they released their third album, Not All There Anymore.

In 2002, Norman Korpi and Clint Owen wrote, produced and directed The Wedding Video, a spoof of The Real World that starred ten alumni of various seasons of The Real World that took the form of the video for Korpi's Beverly Hills wedding. Starring in the video along with himself were Julie Gentry and Heather Gardner, whose single "One Life", is featured in the film. 
As of 2008 Norman Korpi is an artist splitting time between California and Michigan.

Heather Gardner released her first album, Takin' Mine, in 1996. As of 2002 she was living in Jersey City, and had just released her album Eternal Affairs through SAI Records.

Julie Gentry returned to Birmingham. As of 2002, she had been married for four years, had recently become a mother, and was attending school and teaching dance class.

Eric Nies went on to host the MTV dance series The Grind, and also hosted and participated in a number of Real World/Road Rules Challenges. He also appeared in two episodes of Days of Our Lives, as well as bit parts in the films Above the Rim and The Brady Bunch Movie. He returned to reality television as a cast member in the 2009 VH1 series in Confessions of a Teen Idol.

Kevin Powell became a writer for Vibe magazine, an author, activist and a politician. His books include Who's Gonna Take the Weight? and Keepin' It Real, a collection of post-MTV reflections. Powell also lectures around the country about pop culture, politics, and social justice, and has unsuccessfully run for Congress three times in New York. In 2017, he married Jinah Parker.

At the 2008 The Real World Awards Bash, Eric Nies was nominated for the "Hottest Male" award, while Julie and Kevin were in the running for "Best Fight".

In 2021, the original cast reunited for The Real World Homecoming: New York in which the roommates moved back into the same loft in which they lived in 1992, with the exception of Nies, who participated virtually after testing positive for COVID-19. The cast members reflected on their time filming the first season, and discussed ways in which their experiences affected their lives, and those of their families. The cast also discussed ways in which the culture had changed their views on things such as race relations from their time filming the inaugural season in 1992, and how society was reflected in the modern state of reality television, of which they expressed critical views.

The Challenge

Bold indicates the contestant was a finalist on The Challenge.

Note: Eric Nies served as a host on Battle of the Seasons.

References

External links
Official site at MTV.com
The Real World: New York: Meet the Cast MTV.

New York
Television shows set in New York City
1992 American television seasons
Television shows filmed in New York City